Kasyanovka is a rural locality (a selo) in Zhuravskoye Rural Settlement, Kantemirovsky  District, Voronezh Oblast, Russia. The population was 706 as of 2010. There are 3 streets.

Geography
Kasyanovka is located 8 km northwest of Kantemirovka (the district's administrative centre) by road. Novomarkovka is the nearest rural locality.

References 

Rural localities in Kantemirovsky District